The canton of Guillestre is an administrative division in the southeastern France. At the French canton reorganisation which came into effect in March 2015, the canton was expanded from 9 to 15 communes (two of which were merged into the new commune Abriès-Ristolas:
 
Abriès-Ristolas
Aiguilles
Arvieux
Ceillac
Château-Ville-Vieille
Eygliers
Guillestre
Molines-en-Queyras
Mont-Dauphin
Réotier
Risoul
Saint-Clément-sur-Durance
Saint-Crépin
Saint-Véran
Vars

Demographics

See also
Cantons of the Hautes-Alpes department 
Communes of France

References

Cantons of Hautes-Alpes